Legislative Assembly elections were held in the Indian state of Punjab in 1969. Shiromani Akali Dal emerged as the largest party in the Assembly, winning 43 of the 104 seats.

Result

Elected members

References

Punjab
State Assembly elections in Punjab, India
1960s in Punjab, India